The Four Just Men is a 1921 British silent crime film directed by George Ridgwell and starring Cecil Humphreys, Teddy Arundell and Charles Croker-King. It was based on the 1905 novel The Four Just Men by Edgar Wallace. The film still survives unlike many other silent films of the era which are now considered lost. Its plot concerns four vigilantes who seek revenge for the public against criminals.

Synopsis
A hard-headed business tycoon, begins receiving threatening letters from a group who describe themselves as the "Four Just Men". Unless mends his ways and treats his workers better, they promise to kill him. Scotland Yard are called in, but struggle to protect him from the seemingly ever-present threat.

Production
It was made by Stoll Pictures, Britain's largest production company, at their Cricklewood Studios in North London. Location shooting also took place across the city.

Cast
 Cecil Humphreys as Manfred 
 Teddy Arundell as Inspector Falmouth 
 Charles Croker-King as Thery 
 Charles Tilson-Chowne as Sir Philip Ramon 
 Owen Roughwood as Poiccart 
 George Bellamy as Gonsalez 
 Robert Vallis as Billy Marks
 Roy Wood as Sir Philip's Secretary

References

External links

1921 films
British crime films
Films based on British novels
Films directed by George Ridgwell
Stoll Pictures films
Films based on works by Edgar Wallace
British black-and-white films
British silent feature films
Films set in London
1921 crime films
Films shot at Cricklewood Studios
1920s English-language films
1920s British films